Max Keith (born c. 1903 , pronounced "kite") was a German businessman who was the head of Coca-Cola GmbH, the major bottler of Coca-Cola during the Nazi period of German history. 

Keith began working at the German subsidiary of Coca-Cola in 1933, at the age of 30. Between then and 1939, the sales of Coca-Cola in Germany (led by American Ray Rivington Powers) rose from 100,000 cases in 1933 to over 4 million cases just before the outbreak of the Second World War. Following Powers' death in 1938, Keith took over the subsidiary. After the outbreak of the war, Keith worked with the German bureaucracy, and was appointed to the "Office of Enemy Property", hence avoiding nationalization of the subsidiary.

Coca-Cola GmbH was unable to obtain Coca-Cola syrup during World War II, because of the Allied blockade. The supply of regular Coca-Cola ran out in 1942, having been reserved primarily to wounded soldiers in hospitals. To keep the plant in operation, Keith developed a fruit flavored drink made from apple fiber, left over from cider pressings, and whey, a byproduct from cheese manufacture, creating Fanta. The drink sold three million cases in 1943, sustaining the firm's business in Germany. In 1945, at the last stages of the war, Keith was ordered by a German general to rename the subsidiary but he refused, and the general was killed in an air raid before any action was taken against Keith.

References

Coca-Cola people
German businesspeople
Year of death missing
Year of birth missing